The 1947 Istanbul Football Cup season was the fifth season of the cup. The tournament was single-elimination. The final match between Fenerbahçe SK and Beşiktaş JK was not played.

Season

Quarterfinals

|}

|}

Semifinals

|}

Final
*Never played

|}

References

Istanbul Football Cup
Istanbul